Christian Sauter is the name of:

Christian Sauter (footballer), German footballer
Christian Sauter (politician), German politician